Scandium bromide, or ScBr3, is a trihalide, hygroscopic, water-soluble chemical compound of scandium and bromine.

Production and properties
ScBr3 is produced through the burning of scandium in bromine gas.

2 Sc(s) + 3 Br2(g) → 2 ScBr3(s)

Uses 
Scandium bromide is used for solid state synthesis of unusual clusters such as Sc19Br28Z4, (Z=Mn, Fe, Os or Ru). These clusters are of interest for their structure and magnetic properties.

References 

Bromides
Scandium compounds
Metal halides